Johan David (Juho Taavetti) Hyvönen (14 February 1891, in Virtasalmi – 29 January 1975) was a Finnish lawyer, civil servant and politician. He was a member of the Parliament of Finland from 1922 to 1924, representing the Agrarian League.

References

1891 births
1975 deaths
People from Pieksämäki
People from Mikkeli Province (Grand Duchy of Finland)
Centre Party (Finland) politicians
Members of the Parliament of Finland (1922–24)
University of Helsinki alumni